The Rajshree-class patrol vessels are a series of eight inshore patrol vessels built by Garden Reach Shipbuilders & Engineers (GRSE), Kolkata for the Indian Coast Guard.

Design
They are fitted with an integrated bridge system (IBS), integrated machine control system (IMCS). The vessels are powered by three MTU 16V4000M90 series engines capable of generating 2,720 BHP at 2100 rpm each to propel the vessel at a speed of 31.5 knots using three 71S2 Rolls-Royce Kamewa water jet propulsion. At economical speed of 16 knots, they have a range of 1,500 nautical miles. The vessels also generates 320 kW of electric power to feed a wide array of on-board sensors and equipment. The vessels are also fitted with various terrestrial and satellite based communication systems including a Fleet-500 satellite communication system.

The ships are equipped with a 30 mm CRN 91 Naval Gun, which is gyro-stabilized with an electro-optical fire control system. They can undertake day and night patrolling for anti-smuggling, anti-poaching and fisheries monitoring in shallow waters. They also carry on board a high-speed fibre-reinforced plastic boat, two Gemini boats and one water scooter for search and rescue operations. They have fully air conditioned and modular accommodation for 6 officers and 34 sailors.

Ships in class
The first vessel in the series ICGS Rajshree was commissioned by Director General Indian Coast Guard, Vice Admiral M.P. Muralidharan at GRSE Jetty on 15 February 2012. Firstly commanded by Commandant Pankaj Verma, an alumnus of the prestigious US Naval War College, Newport. The ship is named after an old Seaward class defense boat (SDB) of the Indian Navy INS Rajshree that served from 1983 to 2006.The second ship, ICGS Rajtarang, was commissioned at Chennai on 19 May 2012, and the third, ICGS Rajkiran, on  29 August 2012, at Visakhapatnam.

A follow-on order of 5 more ships will be built with deliveries starting by mid 2018.

Indian government gifted a Rajshree-class patrol vessel named PS Zoroaster to Seychelles Coast Guard.

See also
 L&T Interceptor class fast attack craft
 Cochin Fast Patrol Vessels
 ABG fast interceptor craft
 Alcock Ashdown Survey Catamaran

References 

Patrol boat classes
Fast attack craft of the Indian Coast Guard
Ships of the Indian Coast Guard